Conversations with Professor Y is a 1955 novel by the French writer Louis-Ferdinand Céline. The narrative focuses on discussions about literature between an author and an academic. The first two thirds of the novel were published in Nouvelle Revue Française in 1954, and the finished work through Éditions Gallimard the following year.

Reception
Nancy Ramsey of The New York Times reviewed the book in 1986, and wrote that "much of Conversations is hilarious. Celine is self-mocking as he tries to get his name back into circulation. He compares an eager genius to the new Big Bubbly soap product, is adamant in his revulsion at the ascendancy of ideas over emotion and is passionate in his desire to capture the immediacy of conversation on the page[.] ... Conversations is essential for Celine fans, and a good, if tame, introduction for the uninitiated."

See also
 1955 in literature
 20th-century French literature

References

1955 French novels
Novels by Louis-Ferdinand Céline
Novels about writers
Novels first published in serial form
Works originally published in French magazines
Works originally published in literary magazines
Éditions Gallimard books
University Press of New England books